The Pratt & Whitney Canada PW500 is a series of medium thrust turbofan engines designed specifically for business jet applications.

Design and development
The PW530 has a single stage fan, driven by a 2-stage LP turbine, supercharging a 2A/1CF axial-centrifugal HP compressor, driven by a single stage HP turbine. Rated at 2,887 pounds of thrust, it entered service in February 1997.

Although similar in configuration, the PW535 has a T-stage, mounted on the LP shaft behind the fan, to increase overall pressure ratio and core flow. It entered service in September 2000.

On 31 January 2020, Embraer announced improvements to its Phenom 300, including increased speeds and upgraded engines. The engines, designated PW535E1, are rated at 3,478 pounds of thrust.

Similar to the PW535, the PW545 has an additional LP turbine stage to drive a larger diameter fan. It entered service in July 1998.

Applications
 Cessna Citation Bravo (PW530A) 
 Cessna Citation Encore (PW535A)
 Cessna Citation Excel (PW545A)
 General Atomics Avenger (PW545B)
 Embraer Phenom 300 (PW535E)

Specifications

See also

References

External links

 

1990s turbofan engines
Medium-bypass turbofan engines
Mixed-compressor gas turbines
Pratt & Whitney Canada aircraft engines